Vulvar vestibulitis syndrome (VVS), vestibulodynia, or simply vulvar vestibulitis, is vulvodynia localized to the vulvar vestibule. It tends to be associated with a highly localized "burning" or "cutting" type of pain. Until recently, "vulvar vestibulitis" was the term used for localized vulvar pain: the suffix "-itis" would normally imply inflammation, but in fact there is little evidence to support an inflammatory process in the condition. "Vestibulodynia" is the term now recognized by the International Society for the Study of Vulvovaginal Disease.

Provoked vestibulodynia, pain provoked by contact localized to the vulvar vestibule, is the most common subtype of vulvodynia among premenopausal women. The syndrome has been cited as affecting about 10% to 15% of women seeking gynecological care.

Symptoms 
VVS is characterized by severe pain with attempted penetration of the vaginal orifice and reports of tenderness with pressure within the vulval vestibule. Usually there are no reports of pain with pressure to other surrounding areas of the vulva. The feelings of irritation and burning can persist for hours or days following sexual activity, engendering a sense of hopelessness and depression. VVS also can often cause dyspareunia.

The pain may be provoked by touch or contact with an object, such as the insertion of a tampon, with vaginal intercourse, or with the pressure from sitting on a bicycle seat, provoked vestibulodynia, or it may be constant, as in the case of unprovoked, generalized vestibulodynia. Some women have had pain since their first penetration (primary vulvar vestibulitis) while some have had it after a period of time with pain-free penetration (secondary vulvar vestibulitis).

Relationship problems often occur as the result of chronic frustration, disappointment, and depression associated with the condition.

Causes 
Little is known about the cause of vestibulodynia. A number of causes may be involved, including subclinical human papillomavirus infection, chronic recurrent candidiasis, or chronic recurrent bacterial vaginosis.

Muscular causes have been implicated as well, since chronic vulvar pain may be the result of chronic hypertonic perivaginal muscles, leading to vaginal tightening and subsequent pain.

Some investigators have postulated the existence of neurological causes, such as vestibular neural hyperplasia. In vestibulodynia the nerves of the vulva transmit signals of pain when they normally should indicate touch, pressure, heat, or stretch. Normal sensations are processed by the brain as abnormal, which result in a heightened sensitivity, i.e. hyperalgesia.

Finally, psychological factors may contribute to or exacerbate the problem, since the anticipation of pain often results in a conditioned spasmodic reflex along with sexual desire and arousal problems.

Diagnosis 
Diagnosis is readily made by the cotton-swab test, in which pressure is applied in a circular fashion around the vulvar vestibule to assess complaints of pain. Laboratory tests are used to exclude bacterial, viral or yeast infection, and a careful examination of the vulvovaginal area is conducted to assess whether any atrophy is present.

Treatment
Treatment consists of general advice about hygiene and sexual behaviour, pelvic floor and desensitisation exercises, and psychological treatment by a multidisciplinary team.

References

Gynaecologic disorders
Pain